Indore Management Association (IMA), an association of entrepreneurs and professional managers was formed in 1963. The association was registered in July 1990 under the provision of M.P. Non - Trading Corporation Act. 1962. IMA is affiliated to All India Management Association (AIMA) as one of its constituent bodies. It has direct and indirect membership of over 3500 members including corporates, entrepreneurs, professionals, businessmen, academicians and students.

Organisations based in Indore
Management organizations
1963 establishments in Madhya Pradesh